Sotkhali is a  village in Bhatar CD block in Bardhaman Sadar North subdivision of Purba Bardhaman district in the state of West Bengal, India.

History
Census 2011 Sotkhali Village Location Code or Village Code 319820. The village of Sotkhali is located in the Bhatar tehsil of Burdwan district in West Bengal, India.

Demographics
The total geographic area of village is 116.78 hectares. Sotkhali features a total population of 1,161 peoples. There are about 264 houses in Sotkhali  village.

Population and house data

References 

Villages in Purba Bardhaman district